Pekela is a municipality in the province of Groningen in the Netherlands. It was created in 1990 when Oude Pekela and Nieuwe Pekela were merged.

History 
The municipality of Pekela was created when the municipalities of Oude Pekela and Nieuwe Pekela were merged in 1990.

Geography 

It is bordered by the municipalities of:

The river Pekel Aa crosses the municipality from north to south.

Governance 
Mayor (burgemeester) of Pekela is Jaap Kuin of the Labour Party. The municipal council of Pekela consists of 15 seats, which are divided as follows:

Demographics 

Notable people 
 Jan de Boer (1859 in Nieuwe Pekela – 1941) a Dutch gymnast who competed in the 1908 Summer Olympics
 Fré Meis (1921–1992), communist politician
 Janneke Snijder-Hazelhoff (born 1952 in Nieuwe Pekela) a Dutch farmer and politician
 Gerard Wiekens (born 1973 in Oude Pekela) a Dutch former footballer with 518 club caps who played for SC Veendam and Manchester City F.C.

Gallery

References

External links

 

 
Municipalities of Groningen (province)